Dominique Davalos (born November 5, 1965) is American actress, rock singer and bass player formerly in the band Dominatrix, whose controversial music video single "The Dominatrix Sleeps Tonight", released in 1984, was deemed too racy for its time. The song's video, directed by Beth B., featured a fur and stocking-clad Dominique. Commercial radio stations banned the single, and MTV refused to air the risque video. In 2012, the video was placed on display in the contemporary art wing of the Museum of Modern Art in New York City. Davalos has Finnish and Spanish heritage from her father's side.

Music
Dominique worked with former Go-Go Kathy Valentine under the name The Delphines. They released two albums: The Delphines (1996) and Cosmic Speed (2001). Dominique and Kathy's current band The BlueBonnets have released 3 albums to date, Boom Boom Boom Boom (2010) Play Loud (2014) and Tonewrecker (2017). They are currently touring the United States to support this latest release.  Dominique and Kathy also play in the band Lady Band Johnson with Johnny Goudie.

Dominique is currently writing and singing in an all-female rock band called Dogs and Diamonds in Austin, TX. Dogs and Diamonds formed in the summer of 2016 and released their album Last Free Exit in 2018. Last Free Exit was produced by Chris "Frenchie" Smith in the Bubble, Austin TX. Dominique previously wrote, sang and played bass with another Austin Texas born band SuperEtte who released their second EP When People Are Cold And Hard And Hate in 2016. The first EP Yours Til The End was released in 2014.

As a bass player she has played bass for The Keenen Ivory Wayans Show, Tito & Tarantula, and Gods Hotel Featuring Spike from The Quireboys.

Acting
As an actress, she best known for such films as Salvation!, A Woman Under the Influence, Howard the Duck and Stump the Band.

Dominique most recently appeared in the film Virgin Cheerleader In Chains.

Discography 
Studio Albums / EPs
 The Delphines - The Delphines (1996)
 The Delphines - Cosmic Speed (2001)
 Drag - Drag (2001)
 Drag - Loose Like Brando (2005)
 The BlueBonnets - Boom Boom Boom Boom (2010)
 SuperEtte - Yours Til The End (2014)
 The BlueBonnets - Play Loud (2014)
 SuperEtte - When People Are Cold And Hard And Hate (2016)
 The BlueBonnets - Tonewreker (2017)
 Dogs And Diamonds - Last Free Exit (2018)

References

External links
Blue Bonnets official website
Dogs And Diamonds official website
SuperEtte official website

American rock musicians
American film actresses
Women bass guitarists
1965 births
Living people
20th-century American bass guitarists
20th-century women musicians
American people of Finnish descent
American people of Spanish descent
20th-century American actresses
21st-century American women
Place of birth missing (living people)